Elections to Bournemouth Borough Council on the south coast of England were held on 3 May 2007. The whole council (a unitary authority) was up for election.

Background 
The council apologised after an election pack sent to candidates included offensive language.

Election result

|}

References 

2007 English local elections
2007
2000s in Dorset